"Dissident Aggressor" is a song by the English heavy metal band Judas Priest that was first released on Sin After Sin in 1977. In 2010, thirty-three years after its release, the song won the 2010 Grammy Award for Best Metal Performance after being rereleased as a live track on A Touch of Evil: Live.

Description and analysis
"Dissident Aggressor" closes the album Sin After Sin, and is seguéd into from the slow ballad "Here Come the Tears". It is played aggressively on two guitars at a fast tempo; the bass and drums are heavy, and the vocals are screamed at high pitch. The song features what Rolling Stone describes as "driving guitar riffs", and guitarists K. K. Downing and Glenn Tipton trade solos in the song. Rolling Stone further describes the song as an "apocalyptic epic".

Influence on the genre
Judas Priest's 1977 album Sin After Sin introduced the combination of the double bass drum and rapid 16th bass rhythms combined with rapid 16th note guitar rhythms that came to define the genre.  While the double-bass rhythms from Judas Priest are generally measured and technical, "Dissident Aggressor" pushed this to be an example of the style with an increase in "tempo and aggression" which was later adopted by other bands with a much harder-edged approach.

The song features "groundbreaking vocal styles" by Rob Halford which have since come to be regarded as influential.

American thrash metal band Slayer covered the song on their 1988 album South of Heaven. Ironically, Slayer were nominated for the Grammy Award for Best Metal Performance in 2010, for the song "Hate Worldwide", but lost out to Priest's new live version, mentioned above.

The song was also covered by US rock band Halestorm on their 2013 covers EP Reanimate 2.0: The Covers.

References

Judas Priest songs
1977 songs
Grammy Award for Best Metal Performance
Songs written by Rob Halford
Songs written by Glenn Tipton
Songs written by K. K. Downing